The Center for the Political Future (CPF) is a non-partisan center housed in the University of Southern California's Dornsife College of Liberal Arts and Sciences. The center was established in order to combat uncivil political discourse and promote bipartisan, fact-based dialogue on national issues. The Center for the Political Future hosts conferences, offers a Fellows program, hosts an ongoing dialogue series called Political Conversations, and provides a neutral ground for political discourse in "off-the-record policy workshops" with top experts from relevant disciplines, among other programs.

Through its dialogue series, conferences, and workshops, the center has expressed that some of its goals are to "understand and contextualize causes of the political divide" in the United States, "work toward a common fact base," "renew civil discourse to find common ground," and assess the possible "domestic and global implications of different policy approaches" through civil discourse between experts across the ideological spectrum.

About the center

Leadership 
The center's Director is Robert Shrum and its Co-Director is Mike Murphy. Shrum is a longtime Democratic strategist and speechwriter for politicians, including Ted Kennedy, Bill Clinton, Al Gore, and John Kerry. Murphy is a veteran Republican campaign strategist and has worked for candidates Arnold Schwarzenegger, Jeb Bush, John McCain, and Mitt Romney. The center's Executive Director is Kamy Akhavan, former CEO of ProCon.org.

Mission 
The Center for the Political Future brings political professionals together from both sides of the aisle and models bipartisan discussions for students and the national political stage.

The center's stated mission is to “combine rigorous intellectual inquiry, teaching, and practical politics to advance civil dialogue that transcends partisan divisions and explores solutions to our most pressing national and global challenges.”

Objectives 
The Center for the Political Future outlines several objectives, including:

 "Develop a deep understanding of pressing national and global issues and how policy is made at the national and global levels.
 Study and understand the psychological and intellectual scaffold on which conservatives and liberals operate in order to develop more inclusive frameworks for debate and decision making.
 Model and advance civil dialogue demonstrating that individuals with different political perspectives can speak respectfully with each other and find ways to work together.
 Prepare students to become effective citizens by teaching and practicing the skills of practical political leadership."

History 
In 1978, before it was called the Center for the Political Future, USC founded the USC Institute of Politics and Government. A little more than a decade later, in 1987, it was renamed the Jesse M. Unruh Institute of Politics after the late California state politician, Jesse M. Unruh. In 2018, long-time political strategists and friends Robert Shrum (D) and Mike Murphy (R) expanded the Unruh Institute of Politics by creating the Center for the Political Future.

Organization 
The center has several departments and initiatives that further its mission: the Unruh Institute of Politics, the USC Dornsife/LA Times Poll, weekly programming through their Political Conversations series, a Fellows Program, and large-scale conferences.

Unruh Institute of Politics 
The Jesse M. Unruh Institute of Politics, named after long-time California politician Jesse M. Unruh, is a component of the Center for the Political Future. Its focus is on engaging students at USC in politics and public service. It achieves this goal by providing students with internships and practical experiences in politics.

Student programs include immersive professional experiences at the Iowa Caucuses, in California state politics in Sacramento, a leadership conference for LA-based high school women, and related coursework in these areas.

The Unruh Institute has two affiliated student groups, Unruh Associates and VoteSC, which promote student engagement in voting and politics.

USC Dornsife/LA Times Poll 
The USC Dornsife/LA Times poll is maintained by USC’s Center for Economic and Social Research and conducted in partnership with the Center for the Political Future and the Los Angeles Times. The purpose of the probability-based online panel is to track respondents changing attitudes and preferences for political candidates over time.

Political Conversations 
The Center for the Political Future hosts a regular conversation series called Political Conversations, in partnership with the Political Science Department at USC. The Center brings in guests from the world of politics, journalism, and other related fields to expose students to practitioners in journalism, politics, and public policy.

Past guests include:

 Nancy Pelosi – Speaker of the U.S. House of Representatives
 David Axelrod – Senior Advisor to President Obama, CNN Contributor
 Donna Brazile – Former Chairperson of the Democratic National Committee, former Campaign Manager for Al Gore
 Gray Davis – Former Governor of California
 Pedro Sanchez – Prime Minister of Spain
 Joe Kennedy III – Congressman (D-MA)
 Ron Brownstein – Senior Editor at The Atlantic, Senior Political Analyst at CNN
 Joe Trippi – Senior Advisor to US Senator Doug Jones
 Dee Dee Myers – Former White House Press Secretary
 Antonio Villaraigosa – Former Mayor of Los Angeles
 Anthony Scaramucci – Former White House Communications Director
 Rosa DeLauro – Congresswoman (D-CT)
 Mark Lilla – Professor at Columbia University
 Jessica Yellin – Former Chief White House Correspondent at CNN
 Stanley Greenberg – Pollster and Advisor to President Bill Clinton
 David Keene – Former President of the NRA and Opinion Editor at the Washington Times
 Trevor Potter – Former Chairman of the United States Federal Election Commission

Fellows Program 
The Center for the Political Future hosts visiting Fellows each semester to teach classes pertaining to politics, public policy, and journalism.

Fellows have included:

Elan Carr – Former U.S. Special Envoy to Monitor and Combat Anti-Semitism (Fall 2022)
Jessica Lall – President and CEO of Central City Association of Los Angeles (Fall 2022)
Ira Reiner – Former District Attorney for Los Angeles County (Fall 2022)
Noelia Rodriguez – Political Communications veteran. Currently Chief of staff at Metrolink (Fall 2022)
Maria Salinas – President and CEO of Los Angeles Area Chamber of Commerce (Fall 2022)
Shaniqua McClendon – Political Director at Crooked Media (Spring 2021)
Todd Purdum – Longtime Journalist. Formerly with the New York Times, The Atlantic, and Vanity Fair (Spring 2021)
Barbara Comstock – Former United States Representative from Virginia's 10th district (Spring 2021)
Mimi Walters – Former United States Representative from California's 45th district (Fall 2020)
Barbara Boxer – Former United States Senator from California (Fall 2020)
John Chiang – Former California State Treasurer and State Controller (Fall 2020)
Ben Rhodes – Former Deputy National Security Advisor under President Obama and Co-Host of “Pod Save the World” (Spring 2020) 
Jeff Greenfield – Senior Political Correspondent for CBS (Spring 2020) 
 Dr. David Hill – GOP Pollster and Strategist (Spring 2020) 
Ron Christie – Former Special Assistant to President George W. Bush (Fall 2019)
 Ann Klenk – Former Senior Producer of Hardball with Chris Matthews (Fall 2019)
Adam Nagourney – Los Angeles Bureau Chief of the New York Times (Fall 2019)
Symone Sanders – Senior Advisor to Vice President Joe Biden (Spring 2019)
 Mike Madrid – GOP strategist & Co-Founder of the Lincoln Project (Spring 2019)
 Dan Schwerin – Director of Speechwriting for Hillary Clinton (Fall 2018)
Gentry Collins – Former National Political Director at the Republican National Committee (Fall 2018)
Hank Plante - Emmy and Peabody Award-winning political reporter and anchorman.

Conferences 
The Center for the Political Future conducts several annual conferences. The conference themes range from climate change and political tribalism to immigration and elections.

Featured speakers have included:

John Kerry – Former Secretary of State
Mark Sanford – Former Governor and Congressman (R-SC) 
Ana Kasparian – Host of the Young Turks
Eric Garcetti – Mayor of Los Angeles 
Gordon Brown – Former Prime Minister of the United Kingdom
 Barbara Boxer – Former U.S. Senator (D-CA)
Symone Sanders – Senior Advisor to Joe Biden
 Joel Benenson – Pollster for Presidents Barack Obama and Bill Clinton and Secretary of State Hillary Clinton
 Ron Klain – Chief of Staff to Vice Presidents Joe Biden and Al Gore
 Steven Schmidt – Senior Advisor to John McCain
 Ron Christie – Former Special Assistant to President George W. Bush and Vice President Dick Cheney

Other Events 
On March 22, 2022, the Center for the Political Future partnered with Fox11 and the Los Angeles Times to sponsor the Los Angeles Mayoral debate, held at USC's Bovard Auditorium.

References 

University of Southern California
University of Southern California staff
Educational institutions established in 1978
1978 establishments in California
Academic organizations based in the United States
Political research institutes
Political science education
Political science organizations
Public policy research
Political science in the United States